Moes is a surname. Notable people with the name include:

 André Moes (1930–2019), Luxembourgish Olympic cyclist
 Ernst Wilhelm Moes (1864 – 1912), Dutch art historian 
 Freeke Moes (born 1998), Dutch field hockey player
 Gerlacus Moes (1902–1965), Dutch swimmer
 Jeannot Moes (born 1948), Luxembourgish footballer
 Jerzy Moes (1935–2019), Polish actor
 Linda Moes (born 1971), Dutch Olympic swimmer
 Mary Alfred Moes (1828–1899), American Roman Catholic nun
 Wally Moes (1856–1918), Dutch painter
 Władysław Moes (1900–1986), Polish nobleman

See also
Moe (surname)